Mumba may refer to:

People 
Antoine Agbepa Mumba (born 1956),  a DR Congolese soukous singer, dancer, producer, and composer
Carl Mumba (born 1995), Zimbabwean cricketer who plays for Mid West Rhinos
Florence Mumba (born 1948), Zambian judge
Levi Zililo Mumba (died 1945), first President of the Nyasaland African Congress (NAC)
Nevers Mumba (born 1960), Zambian politician and minister
Omero Mumba (born 1989), Irish actor and singer
Prince Mumba (athlete) (born 1984), Zambian Olympic track and field athlete, specializing in the 800 metres
Robert Mambo Mumba (born 1978), Kenyan footballer, currently coaching the Swedish team Dalkurd FF
Samantha Mumba (born 1983), Irish singer and actress
Winter Mumba (died 1993), Zambian footballer and member of the national team
Wisdom Mumba Chansa (1964–1993), Zambian football player
Mumba Mwansa (born 1982), Zambian basketball player
Mumba Kalifungwa (born c. 1970), Zambian accountant, banker and corporate executive
Mumba Samantha  (born 2007) ,Zambian ...Zimbabwean still finishing  GCSE

Places 
Mumba Cave, an archeological site located in Tanzania near Lake Eyasi, containing important Stone Age artifacts
Mumba Devi Temple, an old Hindu temple in the city of Mumbai dedicated to the goddess Mumbā

See also
Mumbai
Mumbar
Mumbhar
Mumbra
Mumbwa
U Mumba

Zambian surnames
Zambian given names
Names of the Democratic Republic of the Congo